The Archives of Macao is a general archive in São Lázaro, Macau. It collects, processes, protects and make available records pertaining Macau.

History
The Archives of Macao was founded as Macao General Archives (Arquivo Geral de Macau; 澳門總檔案室) on 28 June 1952. In 1979, it was renamed as Historical Archives of Macao (Arquivo Histórico de Macau; 澳門歷史檔案室). In 2016, it was renamed to Archives of Macao.

Architecture
The archive is housed in a mansion with colonial style architecture. It was then restored by the Government of Macau.

Collections
The archive has more than 50,000 files, 70,000 photos and 10,000 publications.

See also
 List of tourist attractions in Macau
 History of Macau

References

External links

 

1952 establishments in Macau
Archives in China
Macau Peninsula
Organizations established in 1952